Ah Cacao Real Chocolate, SA de CV is a Mexican chocolate company based in Playa del Carmen, Quintana Roo, Mexico. The company was founded in 2003.

The company operates five retail stores in Mexico under the name Ah Cacao Chocolate Café. selling chocolate and coffee products.

The company financially supports wildlife conservation projects.

In 2008 Ah Cacao Chocolate Café was featured on Rachael Ray's Tasty Travels, a Food Network TV show.

In 2012 Ah Cacao was recognized as a "socially responsible company" (Empresa Socialmente Responsible) by Centro Mexicano para la Filantropía A.C. (CEMEFI/Mexican Center for Philanthropy)

See also
 List of bean-to-bar chocolate manufacturers

References

External links
 Official website

Mexican chocolate companies
Mexican brands
Food and drink companies established in 2003
Mexican companies established in 2003